Immanuel Church is a cruciform church dating from 1833 in the municipality of Halden in Østfold county, Norway. It stands in the center of Halden and belongs to the Deanery of Sarpsborg.

History
The church is built on the site of an older church that burned in 1826. Construction of the church began in 1828 based on plans by the architect Christian Heinrich Grosch in partnership with Ole Peter Riis Høegh, and it was consecrated in 1833. It is built of brick and can accommodate 900 people. The church underwent restoration in 1950.

The church is built in the late Empire style. Nils Marstein of the Norwegian Directorate for Cultural Heritage has called Immanuel Church the single most important creation among the many churches that Grosch built, and he referred to the church as "a masterpiece of Empire style religious architecture in Norway."

Furnishings 
The altar features a statue of Christ from 1833, created by Johan Niclas Byström. The pulpit is made of wood and was designed by Grosch. The baptismal font was also designed by Grosch and it is made of cast iron.

There are five chandeliers in the church, all dating from 1837. The church contains some older pieces of silver work, including a wine cruet from 1707 and a chalice with a paten and lid from 1739.

References

External links
 Norges kirker: Immanuelskirken i Halden
 arc!: Fra Fredrikshalds murarkitektur: Immanuels kirke
 Kirkesøk: Immanuels kirke, Halden

Buildings and structures in Østfold
19th-century Church of Norway church buildings
Churches completed in 1833
1833 in Norway
Cruciform churches in Norway